Andrew Howard Barnes (born 5 February 1960 near Carlisle and grew up in Preston, England) is a New Zealand-based entrepreneur and philanthropist who founded New Zealand's largest corporate trustee company, Perpetual Guardian, and spearheaded the trust company's efforts to create four-day working weeks.

Education 
Barnes attended Hutton Grammar School prior to going to University of Cambridge where he completed his MA in law and archaeology at Selwyn College in 1981. He is an Associate of the Chartered Institute of Bankers (UK) and attended Harvard Business School's Program for Management Development in 1992.

Career 
Barnes began his financial services career in the United Kingdom before moving to Australia at the age of 27.

He spent 20 years in Australia, floating realestate.com.au on the ASX in 1999 and holding senior roles in companies including Macquarie Bank, Citi, Tower, and County Natwest, and was chairman of Australasian Wealth Investments.

A return to the United Kingdom saw Barnes taking on the role of director of Bestinvest.

In 2013, Barnes acquired Perpetual Trust in New Zealand, and a year later he founded Complectus and purchased Guardian Trust, creating Perpetual Guardian. In April 2015, Complectus, with Barnes as managing director, acquired e-will platform My Bucket List and in August added Foundation Corporate Trust to its list of acquisitions.

In 2020, when the Covid-19 pandemic saw New Zealand in lockdown, Barnes pushed for law changes to make digital signatures on wills legal. It has been suggested he could be one of New Zealand's next blue-chip politicians.

The Four-Day Week 
In February 2018, Barnes announced that Perpetual Guardian would be trialing four day work weeks, with staff receiving an extra day off work, on full pay, each week. Staff were not required to work additional hours on their four working days. In late March 2018, Barnes said that the trial was going well with staff reporting more time for family, hobbies, ploughing through to-do lists and home maintenance. After the end of the trial, 78% of employees stated they were able to successfully manage their work–life balance, compared to 54% in November 2017. Employees' stress levels decreased by 7 percentage points and overall life satisfaction increased by 5 percentage points.

The trial sparked widespread international interest  along with commentary from workers unions, other businesses and councillors. It also generated interest from the World Economic Forum, which noted the success of the trial on its weforum.org site.

That interest grew even more when, in July 2018 at the completion of the trial, Barnes announced that the trial had been a resounding success, with productivity up 20%, staff stress levels down, customer engagement levels up more than 30%, revenue remaining stable and costs decreasing. Staff engagement and work–life balance also improved. The trial also sparked interest from the New Zealand Government.  Barnes recommended to the Perpetual Guardian board that the four day work week programme  continue, and it has since been rolled out on a permanent basis.

While the trial proved highly successful for most staff, a very small number of staff reported feeling more stressed or pressured to complete work in the shorter timeframe. The experience prompted the formation of the 4 Day Week Global Campaign and the appointment of a CEO, Charlotte Lockhart, in September 2019.

The successful completion of the trial saw Barnes appearing extensively in both New Zealand and international media. He hailed the four-day work week as a potential means of helping close the gender pay gap and increasing diversity in the workforce, saying women should stop negotiating on hours and start negotiating on their productivity. That theme was picked up by other media in New Zealand. Barnes also held the model up as a potential blueprint for the workplace of the future, ensuring companies were attractive to millennials and a potential way of easing Auckland's traffic congestion.

The trial and subsequent adoption of the four-day work week proved a topic of interest on social media too, prompting plenty of discussion across Facebook and LinkedIn and garnering mention in LinkedIn's US Daily Rundown – dubbed 'the professional news you need to know'.

In July 2018 he appeared on the Kiwi big business podcast, High Altitude, hosted by Dr John Peebles, discussing innovation, change management, philanthropy, entrepreneurship, the military, leadership, team engagement and the four day workweek initiative.

By mid-2019, the topic of a four-day week was at the forefront of global conversation about the future of work. At the International Labor Conference in Geneva in June 2019, Russian Prime Minister Dmitry Medvedev said it was "very likely the future will see a four-day working week as the basis of the social and labor contract." At the same time, the Bank of England's chief economist predicted that the four-day week would replace the standard five-day week for most workers by around 2050, a view endorsed by a survey of British workers. The flexible work model is being trialled in Australia, the United States, Iceland, Germany and the United Kingdom, and the European Trade Union Institute and the Trades Union Congress are campaigning for a shorter working week across much of the workforce. It remains a prominent topic in New Zealand, where Minister of Finance Grant Robertson told The Productivity Hub, "I want to see New Zealand reach a point where we are able to work 400 fewer hours a year while producing more than we do today."

As worldwide attention grew, Barnes advocated for the positive effects a four-day week could have on the climate.

By the time Barnes' book 'The 4 Day Week: How the flexible work revolution can increase productivity, profitability and well-being, and create a sustainable future' was published in January 2020, the initiative had won several global awards.

The four-day week again emerged as a prominent global talking point amid the COVID-19 pandemic, with lockdowns in many countries forcing millions of people to work from home. In a Facebook Live post, New Zealand Prime Minister Jacinda Ardern asked business leaders to look at offering workers a four day week: "I've heard lots of people suggesting we should have a four-day week, ultimately that really sits between employers and employees... There's lots of things we've learned about COVID and just that flexibility of people working from home – the productivity that can be driven out of that." Her comments spurred a fresh wave of global media coverage of the four-day week as part of a future of work where the trend is moving away from large centralised office hubs in downtown metropolitan areas.

Philanthropy 
Barnes is a strong advocate for philanthropy. As the leader of Perpetual Guardian, he established the Perpetual Guardian Foundation, which aims to make donating easy for everyone, enabling donations of as little as $5 to be pooled for causes including feeding the hungry, educating children, supporting the arts and protecting the environment.

Under Barnes' leadership, Perpetual Guardian provided sponsorship for a program which sees 3500 children from rural or low decile schools to visit Otago Museum's planetarium each year in an attempt to encourage youngsters to become interested in science and technology.

In February 2018, Perpetual Guardian stepped in as a private sponsor for the Auckland Primary Schools Music Festival, after Barnes heard that the festival was under threat.

Perpetual Guardian also paid for the Giving New Zealand report into charitable giving in New Zealand in 2015, while Barnes himself set up the NZ Bomber Command Fund to preserve the legacy of the Bomber Command in New Zealand.

He worked with MOTAT to preserve the legacy of the Bomber Command unit through a travelling exhibition, followed by a dedicated archive at MOTAT.

Barnes also stepped in to support the Funeral Directors Association of NZ in their bid to lobby for a law change, in order for funeral directors to be able to make final arrangements for deceased persons where there is no will.

In April 2017 Barnes began a restoration of the classic yacht, Ariki. Ariki is a racing yacht which was built in Auckland, New Zealand in 1904 by the Logan Brothers. She had a distinguished career as a racing and cruising yacht. From the time of her launch in October 1904, she dominated first class Auckland yacht racing until the appearance of the yacht Ranger in 1938. She has the sail number A3.

In April 2020, when the RSA's annual Poppy Appeal had to be postponed due to Covid-19, Barnes stepped in to create a virtual solution to help raise funds. To kickstart the initiative, Barnes and Perpetual Guardian donated $25,000.

Awards 
Barnes was a finalist in the 2015 and 2016 New Zealand EY Entrepreneur of the Year awards.

Barnes also regularly takes part in the Diabetes New Zealand 'Movemeant' Challenge, and won the 2016 annual challenge

References 

1960 births
Living people
Alumni of Selwyn College, Cambridge
British expatriates in Australia
British expatriates in New Zealand